Mount Obruchev is a mountain 15 nautical miles (28 km) east-southeast of Scar Bluffs, near the base of Mawson Peninsula. Mapped by the Soviet Antarctic Expedition, 1958, and named for Soviet geologist Vladimir Obruchev.

References

Mountains of Oates Land